Monsoma pulveratum, the green alder sawfly, is a species of common sawfly in the family Tenthredinidae. It is a European species that has been accidentally introduced in North America.

References

Further reading

External links
 

Tenthredinidae
Insects described in 1783
Taxa named by Anders Jahan Retzius